Spiritual warfare is the Christian concept of fighting against the work of preternatural evil forces. It is based on the biblical belief in evil spirits, or demons, that are said to intervene in human affairs in various ways. Although spiritual warfare is a prominent feature of neo-charismatic churches, various other Christian denominations and groups have also adopted practices rooted in the concepts of spiritual warfare, with Christian demonology often playing a key role in these practices and beliefs, or had older traditions of such a concept unrelated to the neo-charismatic movement, such as the exorcistic prayers of the Catholic Church and the various Eastern Orthodox churches.

Prayer is one common form of "spiritual warfare" practiced amongst these Christians. Other practices may include exorcism, the laying on of hands, fasting with prayer, praise and worship, and anointing with oil.

Doctrines of Spiritual Warfare and Exorcism

Jewish demonology
Jewish demonology escalated with the rise of Jewish pseudepigraphic writings of the 1st Century BCE, in particular with Enochic apocrypha. Jewish apocrypha initially influenced post-New Testament writings of the early fathers, which further defined Christian demonology. Thus followed literary works such as The Didache, The Shepherd of Hermas, Ignatius's epistle to the Ephesians, and Origen's Contra Celsum.

Mainstream Christian demonology
Mainstream Christianity typically acknowledges a belief in the existence (or ontological existence) of demons, fallen angels, the Devil and Satan. In Christian evangelism, doctrines of demonology are influenced by interpretations of the New Testament, namely interpretations of the Gospels, in that dealing with spirits became a customary activity of Jesus' ministry. Mark the Evangelist states that "he traveled throughout Galilee, preaching in their synagogues and driving out demons".

Spiritual Warfare in the Apostle Paul
 Apostle Paul has traditionally been attributed to writing the Book of Ephesians, the tenth book of the New Testament, although it is more likely the work of one of his disciples. Within 6:10-12 of Ephesians, Paul addresses spiritual warfare and how to combat spiritual attacks; "Finally, be strong in the Lord and in his mighty power. Put on the full armor of God, so that you can take your stand against the devil’s schemes. For our struggle is not against flesh and blood, but against the rulers, against the authorities, against the powers of this dark world and against the spiritual forces of evil in the heavenly realms."

Evangelical Christian demonology
Evangelical Christian denominations typically believe that Satan and his agents exert significant influence over the world and its power structures. They also believe that Paul's epistles focus on Jesus' victory over these powers. To this end, evangelical interpretations divide history into two eras: the "present evil age", and the "age to come", in reference to the Second coming of Jesus.

Evangelical imagery of spiritual warfare is derived from various parts of the Bible, particularly the Book of Revelation wherein the 'beasts' and 'kings of the earth' wage war against God's people after the War in Heaven, sparking a final battle with Satan and earthly nations against God.

Evangelical Christians promote the practice of exorcism, based on their understanding of Jesus statement: "If I drive out demons by the spirit of God, then the kingdom of God is upon you" at).

Practices in Christianity

Catholic practices
The most notable of spiritual warfare prayers in the Catholic tradition is known as the Prayer to Saint Michael the Archangel.

Pope John Paul II stated that "'Spiritual combat'... is a secret and interior art, an invisible struggle in which monks engage every day against the temptations".

In modern times, the views of individual Roman Catholics of spiritual warfare have tended to divide into traditional and more modern understandings of the subject. An example of a more modern view of the demonic is found in the work of the Dominican scholar Richard Woods' The Devil.

The traditional outlook is represented by Father Gabriele Amorth, who has written three books on his personal experiences as an exorcist for the Vatican: An Exorcist Tells His Story, and An Exorcist: More Stories, and An Exorcist Explains the Demonic: The Antics of Satan and His Army of Fallen Angels. Francis MacNutt, who was a priest within the Roman Catholic Charismatic Movement, has also addressed the subject of the demonic in his writings about healing.

Lutheranism, Anglicanism and Reformed Christianity 

The practice of exorcism was also known among the first generation of teachers and pastors in the Lutheran Reformation. Johannes Bugenhagen was the pastor of the Wittenberg town church and officiated at Martin Luther's wedding. In a letter addressed to Luther and Melanchthon dated November 1530, Pomeranus recounted his experience of dealing with a young girl who showed signs of demon possession. Pomeranus' method involved counseling the girl concerning her previous baptismal vows, he invoked the name of Christ and prayed with her. (Letter reproduced in Montgomery, Principalities and Powers).

The Anglican-Puritan writer William Gurnall wrote a lengthy three-volume work The Christian in Complete Armour that was published between 1662 and 1665. In this work Gurnall stressed the place of reading Scripture, prayer and the name of Christ.

Eastern Orthodoxy and Oriental Orthodoxy

Evangelicalism
Practices of "spiritual warfare" vary throughout Christianity. The development of specific spiritual warfare techniques has also generated many discussions in the Christian missions community. Critical exchanges of views may be found in periodicals such as the Evangelical Missions Quarterly and in conferences sponsored by the Evangelical Missions Society. In 2000, an international collaborative attempt was made by evangelicals and charismatics in the Lausanne Committee for World Evangelization to reach some common agreement about spiritual warfare. The conference gathered in Nairobi, Kenya, and yielded a consultation document as well as many technical papers published as the book Deliver Us from Evil.

Expositors of spiritual warfare include Jessie Penn-Lewis, who published the Pentecostal 1903 book War on the Saints. Prolific author Pastor Win Worley began the publication of his Hosts of Hell series in 1976, and Kurt E. Koch published Occult ABC in 1973; all contain elements of the concept of spiritual warfare, if not explicitly using the expression.

In 1991, C. Peter Wagner published Confronting the Powers: How the New Testament Church Experienced the Power of Strategic-Level Spiritual Warfare and edited Territorial Spirits. In 1992, Dr. Ed Murphy wrote a modern 600 page book on the subject, The Handbook of Spiritual Warfare, from the point of view of deliverance ministry. Laws of Deliverance, From Proverbs, 1980, 1983, 1995, 2000, 2003, written by Marilyn A. Ellsworth, is another important Biblical work of authority, as is her book ICBM Spiritual Warfare, God's Unbeatable Plan. Other notable expositions on spiritual warfare were written by Pastor Win Worley, Mark Bubeck, and Neil Anderson.

In the American revival tradition among evangelicals, prominent preachers such as D. L. Moody, Billy Sunday, R. A. Torrey and Billy Graham have all affirmed their belief in the existence of the demonic and had occasions to recount some of their own spiritual warfare encounters. In the 19th century, one of the major evangelical authorities on demon possession was the missionary to China, John Livingstone Nevius.

During the late 20th century, Evangelical writers such as Mark Bubeck and Merrill Unger presented their theological and pastoral response to demonic phenomena. The problem of demon possession and spiritual warfare became the subject of a Christian Medical Association symposium that was held in 1975. This symposium brought together a range of evangelical scholars in biblical studies, theology, psychology, anthropology, and missiology.

One of the very significant German writers is the Lutheran Kurt E. Koch whose work has influenced much of both evangelical and charismatic thought in the late twentieth century. The impact of his ideas has been recently examined by the folklore specialist Bill Ellis.

Pentecostalism 
Spiritual warfare has become a prominent feature in Pentecostal traditions. The concept is well embedded in Pentecostal history, particularly through Jessie Penn-Lewis's book War on the Saints arising from the Welsh Revival in the early twentieth century. However, Jessie Penn-Lewis preaches a very different kind of spiritual warfare than that preached by the third-wave Charismatic movement of today—notably C. Peter Wagner and Cindy Jacobs. Other Pentecostal and charismatic pastors include Don Basham, Derek Prince, Win Worley, Bishop Larry Gaiters, Rev. Miguel Bustillos, Dr. Marcus Haggard, and Missionary Norman Parish, who have emphasized using the power of the blood of Christ in the deliverance ministry.

Spiritual Mapping & the Charismatic movement
Spiritual mapping refers to the 21st century Evangelical belief that all history is a battle between Satan and God. Neo-Evangelicals who follow the spiritual mapping movement perceive the world in terms of demonic activity and believe that they can use prayer and other Evangelical religious practices to counteract evil in the world.

According to the Christian Science Monitor, "C. Peter Wagner, head of Global Harvest Ministries in Colorado Springs, Colo., is in the vanguard of the spiritual warfare movement." In the version of spiritual warfare of Wagner and his associates and followers, "spiritual mapping" or "mapping" involves research and prayer, either to locate specific individuals who are then accused of witchcraft, or to locate individuals, groups, or locations that are thought to be victims of witchcraft or possessed by demons, against which spiritual warfare is then waged.  Peter Wagner claims that this type of spiritual warfare was "virtually unknown to the majority of Christians before the 1990s".  According to Wagner, the basic methodology is to use spiritual mapping to locate areas, demon-possessed persons, occult practitioners such as witches and Freemasons, or things they deem "occult idol objects" like statues of Catholic saints, which are then named and fought, using methods ranging from intensive prayer to burning with fire. "[T]hey must burn the idols… the kinds of material things that might be bringing honor to the spirits of darkness: pictures, statues, Catholic saints, Books of Mormon… [T]he witches and warlocks had surrounded the area… When the flames shot up, a woman right behind Doris [Wagner's wife] screamed and manifested a demon, which Doris immediately cast out!" Wagners conceptions about spiritual mapping was opposed by his collaborator John Wimber with whom he had developed many of his earlier spiritual warfare concepts.

Spiritual mapping occurs on both the local and regional level with super-demons laying claim to whole swathes of the globe. Wagner claimed that a particularly powerful entity known as the Queen of Heaven controlled the equatorial regions.

Jehovah's Witnesses
Jehovah's Witnesses believe they are engaged in a "spiritual, theocratic warfare" against false teachings and wicked spirit forces they say try to impede them in their preaching work. Where their religious beliefs have been in conflict with national laws or other authorities—particularly in countries where their work is banned—they have advocated the use of "theocratic war strategy" to protect their interests, by hiding the truth from God's "enemies", being evasive, or withholding truthful or incriminating information. The Watchtower told Witnesses: "It is proper to cover over our arrangements for the work that God commands us to do. If the wolfish foes draw wrong conclusions from our maneuvers to outwit them, no harm has been done to them by the harmless sheep, innocent in their motives as doves."

Christian teachings on the occult

In May 2021, the Baptist Deliverance Study Group of the Baptist Union of Great Britain, a Christian denomination, issued a "warning against occult spirituality following the rise in people trying to communicate with the dead". The commission reported that "Becoming involved in activities such as Spiritualism can open up a doorway to great spiritual oppression which requires a Christian rite to set that person free."

Non-Christian practices
Spiritual warfare has also been practiced by non-Christians and in non-Christian countries. According to the Christian Broadcasting Network commentator Carl Moeller, spiritual warfare is practiced even in North Korea, a country that has been described as the most dangerous place on earth to be Christian. Non-Christian media reported on the African spiritual warrior Pastor Thomas Muthee visit to America who prayed over a 2008 presidential candidate. The Nigerian Tribune, the oldest surviving private newspaper in Nigeria, has published articles calling for the need for spiritual warfare. In the case of Haiti, American televangelist Pat Robertson and others blamed the earthquake of 2010 on demons, and called for Christians to increase spiritual warfare prayer.

Criticism 
Outside of Evangelicalism, many Christians explicitly reject the concept of spiritual warfare. In Germany, the Evangelic Lutheran Church and the Evangelical German Evangelical Alliance consider it to be "unbiblical", stating "The aggressive attitude and the presumption to fight against evil alongside or even instead of Christ, stands in opposition to the spirit of the gospel."

In evangelism and worldwide Christian missions, former missionaries such as Charles Kraft and C. Peter Wagner have emphasized problems with demonic influences on the world mission fields and the need to drive demons out. Robert Guelich of Fuller Theological Seminary has questioned the extent to which spiritual warfare has shifted from its basic moorings from being a metaphor for the Christian life. He underlines how spiritual warfare has evolved into "spiritual combat" techniques for Christians to seek power over demons. Guelich argues that the writings of the Apostle Paul in the Epistle through Ephesians are focused on proclaiming the peace of God and nowhere specify any techniques for battling demons. He also finds that the novels of Frank Peretti are seriously at odds with both the gospel narratives on demons and Pauline teaching.

Missions specialists such Scott Moreau and Paul Hiebert have detected traces of animist thought encroaching on both evangelical and charismatic discourses about the demonic and spiritual warfare. Hiebert indicates that a dualist cosmology now appears in some spiritual warfare texts and it is based on the Greco-Roman mystery religions and Zoroastrian myths. However, Hiebert also chastises other evangelicals who have absorbed the modern secular outlook and have tended to downplay or even ignore the demonic. Hiebert speaks of the flaw of the excluded middle in the thinking of some evangelicals who have a cosmology of God in heaven and humans on earth, but have ignored the "middle" realm of the angelic and demonic.

Some critics have linked the rise in aggressive forms of prayer to the increasing militarization of everyday life that characterizes 20th century cultural shifts towards the widespread normalization of highly militarized discourse, particularly in the practices and rituals of religious prayer and conversion.

Christian countercult movement
The excesses of allegations made in the satanic ritual abuse phenomenon of the 1980s and 1990s have prompted critical reviews of spiritual warfare thought and practices. Some apologists in the Christian countercult movement have expressed concerns that spiritual warfare techniques seem at times to have been based on spurious stories and anecdotes without careful discernment and reflection. Some of these general concerns have been expressed by apologists like Elliot Miller (Christian Research Institute), and Bob and Gretchen Passantino in various articles published in the Christian Research Journal. Others, such as Mike Hertenstein and Jon Trott, have called into question the claims of alleged ex-Satanists like Mike Warnke and Lauren Stratford whose stories have subsequently influenced many popular books about spiritual warfare and the occult. Bill Ellis's work, Raising the Devil, has detected the presence of folkloric stories about the occult and demons circulating in evangelical and charismatic circles, which later become accepted as unquestioned facts.

Cultural influence
Popular fictional portrayals of spiritual warfare are found in novels by Frank E. Peretti, This Present Darkness and Piercing the Darkness, and Darrin J Mason, Ominous. There are also many articles, books, and blog topics about this on Patheos.com.

See also 
Jihad
Ed Kalnins
Frank Hammond
New Testament military metaphors
Prayer warrior
Territorial Spirit
Thomas Muthee
World to Come
Walter Wink

References

Footnotes
 Revised Edition, Exorcism with the Paranormal & The Occult by Fr. Jose Francisco C. Syquia. Director, Archdiocese of Manila Office of Exorcism.

Bibliography
 Guelich, Robert A. "Spiritual Warfare: Jesus, Paul and Peretti," Pneuma: The Journal of the Society for Pentecostal Studies, 13/1 (1991), pp. 33–64. 
 Moreau, A Scott. Tokunboh Adeyemo, David G. Burnett, Bryant L. Myers & Hwa Yung, eds., Deliver Us From Evil: An Uneasy Frontier in Christian Mission (Monrovia: MARC, 2002). 
 Wakeley, Mike. "A Critical Look at a New 'Key' to Evangelization," Evangelical Missions Quarterly, 31/2 (1995), pp. 152–162. [a contra view](Also see Tai M. Yip, "Spiritual Mapping: Another Approach", [a pro view] in the same edition).

Further reading
Pedro Okoro, The Ultimate Guide to Spiritual Warfare: Learn to Fight from Victory, Not for Victory (Pedro Sajini Publishing, 2015)
James K. Beilby and Paul Rhodes Eddy, eds., Understanding Spiritual Warfare: Four Views (Grand Rapids: Baker Academic, 2012).
Bill Ellis, Raising the Devil: Satanism, New Religious Movements, and the Media (Lexington: University Press of Kentucky, 2000).
Robert A. Guelich, "Spiritual Warfare: Jesus, Paul and Peretti," Pneuma: The Journal of the Society for Pentecostal Studies, 13/1 (1991), pp. 33–64.
Paul G. Hiebert, "Biblical Perspectives on Spiritual Warfare," in Anthropological Reflections on Missiological Issues (Grand Rapids: Baker, 1994), pp. 203–215.
Powlison, David, Power Encounters: Reclaiming Spiritual Warfare (Baker Book House, Nov 1, 1994 )
Lowe, Chuck, Territorial Spirits and World Evangelisation: A Biblical, Historical and Missiological Critique of Strategic-level Spiritual Warfare (Mentor/OMF, 1998)
Edward F. Murphy, The Handbook for Spiritual Warfare (Thomas Nelson Publishers, 2003)
Torsten Löfstedt, "Establishing authority in Spiritual Warfare literature", HumaNetten 41 (2018), p. 4-24

In fiction
Tobin's Spirit Guide
Spates Catalog of Nameless Horrors

External links

 
Demons in Christianity
Christian mysticism
Christian terminology
Conspiracy theories